Dungeon Master Nexus is a Dungeon Master sequel released in Japan, solely for Sega Saturn and in Japanese. It is the first game in the series using a 3D graphics engine. The game features 15 levels. Despite being published under the FTL label, it was developed in Japan.

References

External links 
Official website (archived, Japanese)

Role-playing video games
Action role-playing video games
First-person party-based dungeon crawler video games
Fantasy video games
Japan-exclusive video games
Puzzle video games
Sega Saturn games
Sega Saturn-only games
1998 video games
Victor Interactive Software games
Video games developed in Japan
Video games scored by Tsukasa Tawada
Single-player video games